Rachel Heng (born 1988) is a Singaporean novelist and the author of the literary dystopian novel Suicide Club. Her short fiction has been published in many literary journals including The New Yorker, Glimmer Train, Tin House, The Minnesota Review and others. Her fiction has received recognition from Pushcart and from the Jane Geske awards and she has been profiled by the BBC, Electric Literature and other publications. Her second novel, The Great Reclamation, will be published by Riverhead Books and is expected in 2022.

Biography
Rachel Heng majored in Comparative Literature at Columbia University, graduating in 2011. She then worked in the private equity industry in London. She received a James A. Michener Fellowship to pursue a MFA in fiction and screenwriting at the University of Texas at Austin's Michener Center for Writers.

Works
Her first novel Suicide Club was published by Hachette's Sceptre imprint in the UK, and Macmillan's Henry Holt imprint in the US in July 2018. The manuscript won a six-figure publishing deal after a bidding auction between international publishers. The novel is a piece of dystopian fiction set in a world of compulsory state-managed longevity, and satirizes contemporary culture's obsession with health. The plot centers on a group of rebels called the "Suicide Club" which circulates secretly-filmed videos of their own suicides as a form of release and protest against the health-obsessed establishment.  The novel was inspired by dystopian pieces such as George Orwell's Animal Farm and Margaret Atwood's The Handmaid's Tale. Heng's novel was named a most anticipated novel of the summer by The Huffington Post, Gizmodo, The Irish Times, The Millions, Bustle, NYLON and Elle. Critics have compared Suicide Club favourably to Kazuo Ishiguro's Never Let Me Go, Chuck Palahniuk's Fight Club and Oscar Wilde's The Picture of Dorian Gray. Suicide Club is pending translation into 10 languages worldwide.

Heng's short fiction has been published widely in literary journals such as The New Yorker, Glimmer Train, Tin House, Prairie Schooner, The Offing, Timothy McSweeney's Quarterly Concern, and The Minnesota Review. Her fiction has received a Pushcart special mention and Prairie Schooner'''s Jane Geske award. She has written essays and features for The Telegraph, The Rumpus, Grazia and Catapult. Her essay 'On Becoming A Person of Colour' was one of The Rumpus's top read posts of 2018, a 2018 Staff Pick and has been nominated for a Pushcart Prize. She was listed by The Independent as one of ten emerging authors to look out for in 2018 and has been profiled by outlets such as the BBC, Electric Literature and The Straits Times. In 2021, she was longlisted for the Sunday Times Audible Short Story Award.

Bibliography
 Suicide Club'' (Hachette, Henry Holt, 2018)

References

External links
 

Living people
1988 births
Singaporean people of Chinese descent
Columbia College (New York) alumni
Singaporean novelists
Date of birth missing (living people)
Michener Center for Writers alumni